is a municipal art gallery in Yonago, Tottori Prefecture (Japan) that opened in 1983.

The gallery has a permanent collection of paintings and photographs; the latter is particularly strong for the photographers Teikō Shiotani and Shōji Ueda. It also hosts special exhibitions.

The museum is at Nakamachi 12, Yonago-shi.

References
Matsumoto Norihiko, ed. Nihon no bijutsukan to shashin korekushon (Japan's art galleries and photography collections). Kyoto: Tankōsha, 2002. . Pp. 136–39.

External links
Yonago City Museum of Art 
The building 

Art museums and galleries in Japan
Art museums established in 1983
Museums in Tottori Prefecture
1983 establishments in Japan
Yonago, Tottori